South Harbor is a station on the RTA Waterfront Line in Cleveland, Ohio. It is the northern terminus of the Waterfront Line and the terminus of the Blue and Green Lines.

The station is located in a rather isolated setting on the southeast side of the Cleveland Municipal Parking Lot (locally known as the "Muni Lot"), and is generally only useful to access the parking areas. Cleveland Burke Lakefront Airport is relatively close to the station, but to reach the airport one must cross the Cleveland Memorial Shoreway, and there is no pedestrian crossing.

History
The station opened on July 10, 1996, when light rail service was extended 2.2 miles from Tower City through The Flats and along the lakefront. This extension was designated the Waterfront Line, although it is actually an extension of the Blue and Green Lines, as trains leaving this station toward Tower City continue along the Blue or Green Line routes to Shaker Heights.

There have been several proposals to extend the Waterfront Line beyond South Harbor station since its completion in 1996. The proposal currently under consideration would extend the line southeast from 
through downtown past Playhouse Square and the Cuyahoga Community College main campus, where it would reconnect with the existing line in the vicinity of East 30th Street and the Main Post Office.
The proposal is intended to improve downtown access to the rapid transit system and to “complete the loop” initiated by the Waterfront Line extension.

Another proposal, part of Cleveland's Lakefront Plan, is to extend the line east along the lakefront as far as East 88th Street and possibly out to Collinwood, where public and private sector development investments would be targeted.

Station layout

Notable places nearby
 Cleveland Municipal Parking
 Cleveland Burke Lakefront Airport

Gallery

References

External links

Waterfront Line (RTA Rapid Transit)
Railway stations in the United States opened in 1996
Railway stations closed in 2020
1996 establishments in Ohio